The 50th Writers Guild of America Awards, given on 21 February 1998, honored the best writers in film and television of 1997.

Film

Best Adapted Screenplay
L.A. Confidential – Curtis Hanson and Brian Helgeland
Donnie Brasco – Paul Attanasio
The Ice Storm – James Schamus
Wag the Dog – Hilary Henkin and David Mamet
The Wings of the Dove – Hossein Amini

Best Original Screenplay
As Good as It Gets – Mark Andrus and James L. Brooks
Boogie Nights – Paul Thomas Anderson
The Full Monty – Simon Beaufoy
Good Will Hunting – Matt Damon and Ben Affleck
Titanic – James Cameron

Television

Best Episodic Drama
 "Entrapment" - Law & Order - Rene Balcer and Richard Sweren
"Whose Appy Now?" - ER - Neal Baer
"Deadbeat" - Law & Order - Ed Zuckerman and I. C. Rapoport

Best Episodic Comedy
 "The Fatigues" - Seinfeld - Gregg Kavet and Andy Robin
"The Puppy Episode" - Ellen - Mark Driscoll, Dana Savel, Tracey Newman, Jonathan Stark and Ellen DeGeneres
"The Impossible Dream" - Frasier - Rob Greenberg
"The Chicken Roaster" - Seinfeld - Alec Berg and Jeff Schaffer
"The Bizarro Jerry" - Seinfeld - David Mandel
"Ellen, Or Isn't She?" - The Larry Sanders Show - Judd Apatow, John Markus and Garry Shandling
"The Book" - The Larry Sanders Show - Maya Forbes

1997 Daytime Serials
Winner- 
General Hospital: Claire Labine; Matthew Labine; Robert Guza, Jr.; Karen Harris; Michele Val Jean; Meg Bennett; Ralph Ellis; Mary Ryan; Jane Atkins; Stephanie Braxton; Judith Pinsker; Lynda Myles; Elizabeth Korte; Patrick Mulcahey; Lisa Lieberman
 
Other Nominees: 
All My Children: Agnes Nixon; Lorraine Broderick; Hal Corley; Fredrick Johnson; Gail Lawrence; Jeff Beldner; Christina Covino; Courtney Sherman; Millee Taggart; Karen Lewis; Elizabeth Smith; Michelle Patrick; Bettina F. Bradbury; Judith Donato; Kathleen Klein; Jane Owen Murphy

References
WGA - Previous award winners

1997
1997 film awards
Writ
1997 in American cinema
1997 in American television
February 1998 events in the United States